Choc7 is a Taiwanese boyband group led by Ah Ben and is the second spin-off group of the Taiwanese variety show Mo Fan Bang Bang Tang (模范棒棒堂).

Career
A year after Lollipop was formed, Channel [V] is ready to create the second batch pop group of Bang Bang Tang variety show. After a round of making-the-band competitions, ten boys remained. Prior to the creation of Choc7, two five-member groups were formed: "Knights of Princess (Gong Zhu Bang)"; and "Elite of Otaku (Zhai Nan Shu)", which battled with each other in order to win the available spots in the new to-be-formed group. The former is formed by 翁瑞迪 (Ah Ben),韦佳宏 (Ye Shou), 簡翔棋 (Xiao Ma), 王勇翰 (Han Jiang), and 邱翊橙 (Mao Di), while the latter is formed by 江振愷 (Terry),  劉祿存 (Louis/Xiao Lu), 吳俊諺 (Wei Yu), 李銓 (Li Quan), and 謝東裕 (Ya Gao). The two groups battled simultaneously, which includes releasing of the same EPs with different tracks as part of their next stage of competition. On 11 July 2008, the two groups released an EP album entitled Adventure World (冒險世界), which consists of two versions, as said earlier. Eventually, 3 members were eliminated, and 7 were able to advance. Choc7, the newly formed group after Lollipop, was finally announced in 2008.

On 29 May 2009, Choc7 released their first EP entitled Too Young (太青春), which consists of three songs. The first song, Tai Qing Chun, was written by their seniors, Lollipop; the second song, Wo Tai Ben was written by Mao Di's brother, Wang Zi; and the third song Deng Shen Me was written by Choc7's Wei Yu (吳俊諺).

In 2010, Mao Di and his co-member Wei Yu (吳俊諺) signed under A Legend Star Entertainment, and a rumor of Choc7's disbandment was spread and heard. However, it is still not confirmed as of 2012.

Members

Discography

EP

Music Videos

Filmography

Films

Television Series

References

Taiwanese boy bands
Musical groups established in 2008
Mandopop musical groups
Living people
Taiwanese dancers
Taiwanese Mandopop singers
Musicians from Taipei
Taiwanese Mandopop singer-songwriters
Taiwanese male singers
Dance groups
Year of birth missing (living people)